The Council of Ministers is the cabinet of the Government of Ethiopia. Under the Constitution of Ethiopia, the Council of Ministers is the country's executive body.

History

Hailemariam cabinets
 Council of Ministers of Hailemariam Desalegn (2012–2018)

Abiy cabinets
 Council of Ministers of Abiy Ahmed (2018–present

Current cabinet
As of 6 October 2021, the cabinet comprises:

Cabinet-level officials
The Prime Minister may appoint additional positions to be members of the Cabinet;

References

Sources

Cabinets of Ethiopia
Government of Ethiopia